The 1973 CFL season is considered to be the 20th season in modern-day Canadian football, although it is officially the 16th Canadian Football League season.

CFL News in 1973
Both the Western and Eastern Conferences adopt the same playoff procedure, consisting of the second place teams in each conference hosting the third place teams in the conference semifinal games and the first place teams hosting the semi-finals' winners in the conference finals. All rounds now consisted of single-game playoffs, as opposed to a two-game total point series (although this format would return in use by what was by then the East Division in 1986 only); the West adopted this format the previous year. Other than the addition of the crossover rule in 1997, this playoff format is in still in use in the CFL.

This was the final season where the conferences would play seasons of different lengths. The Eastern Conference would expand its schedule to sixteen games for 1974. Somewhat ironically, this was also the most recent season (as of 2017) where a fourth-placed Eastern team would earn more points (despite playing fewer games) than the third placed Western team - the scenario which triggers a "crossover" under the current playoff format.

Regular season standings

Final regular season standings
Note: GP = Games Played, W = Wins, L = Losses, T = Ties, PF = Points For, PA = Points Against, Pts = Points

Bold text means that they have clinched the playoffs.
Edmonton and Ottawa have first round byes.

Grey Cup playoffs

The Ottawa Rough Riders are the 1973 Grey Cup champions, defeating the Edmonton Eskimos, 22–18, at Toronto's Exhibition Stadium. Ottawa's Charlie Brandon (DE) was named the Grey Cup's Most Valuable Player, while Edmonton's Garry Lefebvre (DB) was named Grey Cup's Most Valuable Canadian.

Playoff bracket

*-Team won in Overtime.

CFL Leaders
 CFL Passing Leaders
 CFL Rushing Leaders
 CFL Receiving Leaders

1973 CFL All-Stars

Offence
QB – Ron Lancaster, Saskatchewan Roughriders
RB – George Reed, Saskatchewan Roughriders
RB – Roy Bell, Edmonton Eskimos
RB – John Harvey, Montreal Alouettes
TE – Peter Dalla Riva, Montreal Alouettes
WR – George McGowan, Edmonton Eskimos
WR – Johnny Rodgers, Montreal Alouettes
C – Paul Desjardins, Toronto Argonauts
OG – Jack Abendschan, Saskatchewan Roughriders
OG – Ed George, Montreal Alouettes
OT – Bill Frank, Winnipeg Blue Bombers
OT – Charlie Turner, Edmonton Eskimos

Defence
DT – John Helton, Calgary Stampeders
DT – Rudy Sims, Ottawa Rough Riders
DE – Bill Baker, Saskatchewan Roughriders
DE – Jim Corrigall, Toronto Argonauts
LB – Jerry Campbell, Ottawa Rough Riders
LB – Ray Nettles, BC Lions
LB – Mike Widger, Montreal Alouettes
DB – Lorne Richardson, Saskatchewan Roughriders
DB – Larry Highbaugh, Edmonton Eskimos
DB – Al Marcelin, Ottawa Rough Riders
DB – Lewis Porter, Hamilton Tiger-Cats
DB – Dick Adams, Ottawa Rough Riders

1973 Eastern All-Stars

Offence
QB – Joe Theismann, Toronto Argonauts
RB – Jim Evenson, Ottawa Rough Riders
RB – Andy Hopkins,  Hamilton Tiger-Cats
RB – John Harvey, Montreal Alouettes
TE – Peter Dalla Riva, Montreal Alouettes
WR – Eric Allen, Toronto Argonauts
WR – Johnny Rodgers, Montreal Alouettes
C – Paul Desjardins, Toronto Argonauts
OG – Ed Chalupka, Hamilton Tiger-Cats
OG – Ed George, Montreal Alouettes
OT – Bill Danychuk, Hamilton Tiger-Cats
OT – Dan Yochum, Montreal Alouettes

Defence
DT – Gordon Judges, Montreal Alouettes
DT – Rudy Sims, Ottawa Rough Riders
DE – Carl Crennel, Montreal Alouettes
DE – Jim Corrigall, Toronto Argonauts
LB – Jerry Campbell, Ottawa Rough Riders
LB – Gene Mack, Toronto Argonauts
LB – Mike Widger, Montreal Alouettes
DB – Tim Anderson, Toronto Argonauts
DB – Dickie Harris, Montreal Alouettes
DB – Al Marcelin, Ottawa Rough Riders
DB – Lewis Porter, Hamilton Tiger-Cats
DB – Dick Adams, Ottawa Rough Riders

1973 Western All-Stars

Offence
QB – Ron Lancaster, Saskatchewan Roughriders
RB – George Reed, Saskatchewan Roughriders
RB – Roy Bell, Edmonton Eskimos
RB – Johnny Musso, BC Lions
TE – Lefty Hendrickson, BC Lions
WR – George McGowan, Edmonton Eskimos
WR – Tom Forzani, Calgary Stampeders
C – Basil Bark, Calgary Stampeders
C – Bob Howes, Edmonton Eskimos
C – Bob Swift, Winnipeg Blue Bombers
OG – Jack Abendschan, Saskatchewan Roughriders
OG – Ralph Galloway, Saskatchewan Roughriders
OT – Bill Frank, Winnipeg Blue Bombers
OT – Charlie Turner, Edmonton Eskimos

Defence
DT – John Helton, Calgary Stampeders
DT – John LaGrone, Edmonton Eskimos
DE – Bill Baker, Saskatchewan Roughriders
DE – Ron Estay, Edmonton Eskimos
LB – Sam Britts, Edmonton Eskimos
LB – Ray Nettles, BC Lions
LB – Roger Goree, Saskatchewan Roughriders
DB – Lorne Richardson, Saskatchewan Roughriders
DB – Larry Highbaugh, Edmonton Eskimos
DB – Frank Andruski, Calgary Stampeders
DB – Gene Lakusiak, Winnipeg Blue Bombers
DB – Ted Provost, Saskatchewan Roughriders

1973 CFL Awards
CFL's Most Outstanding Player Award – George McGowan (WR), Edmonton Eskimos
CFL's Most Outstanding Canadian Award – Gerry Organ (K), Ottawa Rough Riders
CFL's Most Outstanding Lineman Award – Ray Nettles (LB), BC Lions
CFL's Most Outstanding Rookie Award – Johnny Rodgers (WR), Montreal Alouettes
CFL's Coach of the Year – Jack Gotta, Ottawa Rough Riders
 Dr. Beattie Martin Trophy (Western Rookie of the Year) - Lorne Richardson (DB), Saskatchewan Roughriders
 DeMarco–Becket Memorial Trophy (Western Outstanding Lineman) - Ray Nettles (LB), BC Lions

References 

CFL
Canadian Football League seasons